is a Japanese footballer currently playing as a midfielder for Thespakusatsu Gunma.

Career statistics

Club
.

Notes

References

External links

2000 births
Living people
Association football people from Gunma Prefecture
Kansai University alumni
Japanese footballers
Association football midfielders
Thespakusatsu Gunma players